Ridens is a genus of Neotropical butterflies in the family Hesperiidae (Eudaminae).

Species
Ridens allyni Freeman, 1979 - Mexico, Guatemala
Ridens bidens Austin, 1998 - Brazil (Rondônia).
Ridens biolleyi (Mabille, 1900) - Costa Rica
Ridens bridgmani (Weeks, 1902) - Ecuador, Bolivia, Brazil
Ridens crison (Godman & Salvin, [1893])
R. crison crison - Guatemala, Mexico
R. crison cachinnans (Godman, 1901) - Panama
R. crison howarthi  Steinhauser, 1974 - El Salvador
Ridens fieldi Steinhauser, 1974 - Guatemala
Ridens fulima Evans, 1952 - Brazil (Espírito Santo)
Ridens fulminans (Herrich-Schäffer, 1869) - Mexico to Brazil
Ridens harpagus (C. & R. Felder, 1867) - Colombia
Ridens mephitis (Hewitson, 1876) - Mexico, Panama, Peru, Bolivia, Venezuela
Ridens mercedes Steinhauser, 1983 - Mexico
Ridens miltas (Godman & Salvin, [1893]) - Mexico
Ridens nora Evans, 1952 - Peru
Ridens pacasa (Williams, 1927) - Bolivia
Ridens panche  (Williams, 1927) - Colombia
Ridens philistus (Hopffer, 1874)
R. philistus philistus - Peru
R. philistus philia  Evans, 1952 - Colombia
Ridens ridens (Hewitson, 1876) - Panama to Brazil
Ridens telegonoides (Mabille & Boullet, 1912) - Colombia
Ridens toddi Steinhauser, 1974 - El Salvador
Ridens tristis (Draudt, [1922]) - Bolivia, Peru

References

Natural History Museum Lepidoptera genus database

External links
images representing Ridens at Consortium for the Barcode of Life

Hesperiidae
Hesperiidae of South America
Hesperiidae genera